The first elections to the newly created Solihull Metropolitan Borough Council were held on Thursday, 10 May 1973, with the entirety of the 51 seat council - three seats for each of the 17 wards - up for vote. The Local Government Act 1972 stipulated that the elected members were to shadow and eventually take over from the predecessor corporation on 1 April 1974. The order in which the councillors were elected dictated their term serving, with third-place candidates serving two years and up for re-election in 1975, second-placed three years expiring in 1976 and 1st-placed five years until 1978.

The election resulted in the Conservatives gaining control of the council.

Ward results

References

1973 English local elections
1973
1970s in the West Midlands (county)